It's Me may refer to:

 "It's Me" (song), a 1994 single by Alice Cooper
 It's Me (EP), a 2016 EP by South Korean singer Hyolyn
 "It's Me (Pick Me)", a 2017 song
 "It's Me", a 2009 song by Sara Groves from the album Fireflies and Songs